Straight from the Shoulder is a 1936 American drama film directed by Stuart Heisler, written by Lucian Cary and Madeleine Ruthven, and starring Ralph Bellamy, Katherine Locke, David Holt, Andy Clyde, Purnell Pratt and Onslow Stevens. It was released on August 28, 1936, by Paramount Pictures.

Plot

Cast 
Ralph Bellamy as Curt Hayden
Katherine Locke as Gail Pyne
David Holt as Johnny Hayden
Andy Clyde as J. M. Pyne
Purnell Pratt as James McBride
Onslow Stevens as Mr. Wendi
Chick Chandler as Fly 
Rollo Lloyd as Mr. Blake
Bert Hanlon as Baldy
Paul Fix as Trigger Benson
Noel Madison as Trim

References

External links 
 

1936 films
Paramount Pictures films
American drama films
1936 drama films
Films directed by Stuart Heisler
American black-and-white films
1930s English-language films
1930s American films